Edgard Blochet (December 12, 1870 – September 51, 1937) was a French orientalist, translator, bibliographer, art historian, specializing in particular in the history of religions. He graduated in Arabic from the School of Oriental Languages in Paris, then graduated from the École Pratique des Hautes Etudes where he became an assistant between 1895 and 1901, while being part of the manuscripts department of the National Library of France, where he was appointed vice-librarian in 1895 and assistant curator in 1929. Then he became a curator. He retired in November 1935 for age limit.

Sources 
 Edgard Blochet (b. 1870), French art historian, bibliographer, translator into French of selections iranicaonline.org 
 (en) K. A. C. Creswell, A Bibliography of the Architecture, Arts and Crafts of Islam.
 (en) Article «BLOCHET (Gabriel Joseph) Edgard», in: Encyclopaedia Iranica (article de Francis Richard, lire en ligne).

French orientalists
1870 births
1937 deaths
French translators
French bibliographers
French art historians
French Iranologists
Recipients of the Legion of Honour
French historians of religion